India is a country in South Asia. It is made up of 28 states and 8 union territories. Most of the states and union territories of India have their own state emblem, seal or coat of arms which are used as official governmental symbol, while five states and five union territories use the National Emblem of India as their official governmental seal.

States

Union territories

Autonomous administrative divisions 
Some of the autonomous administrative divisions established by the Sixth Schedule of the Constitution of India have adopted their own symbols.

See also
 National Emblem of India
 Lion Capital of Ashoka
 List of Indian state symbols
 List of Indian state flags
 List of Indian state mottos
 List of Indian state songs
 List of Indian state foundation days
 List of Indian state animals
 List of Indian state birds
 List of Indian state flowers
 List of Indian state trees

References

External links
 World Statesmen
 Knowindia.gov.in:  States and Union Territories Symbols

State emblems
Emblems
 
State
Emblems